Ruby & the Rockits was an American comedy series executive produced by Shaun Cassidy and Marsh McCall. The series premiered on Tuesday, July 21, 2009.

The series was created by Shaun Cassidy, the creator of American Gothic and Invasion, brother of cast member Patrick Cassidy, and half-brother of the show's star David Cassidy.  Their youngest brother Ryan Cassidy worked on the show in a behind-the-scenes capacity.

Premise
Ruby & the Rockits follows Patrick Gallagher, a former teen icon, who has chosen to lead a quiet life with his wife Audie (herself an ex-1980s music video dancer) and two sons. But when his former Rockits bandmate and brother, David, shows up unexpectedly with his new-found teenage daughter in tow, the Gallagher family's life becomes anything but normal. David, who refuses to give up his past glory days, comes to Patrick for help raising Ruby while he continues to perform. Patrick must now put the past with David behind them in order to help raise Ruby and keep order within the rest of the Gallagher clan.

Production
Ruby & the Rockits was written by former teen idol Shaun Cassidy and Ed Yeager, with teleplay by Ed Yeager and Marsh McCall. Former teen idol David Cassidy, his brother Patrick Cassidy, Katie A. Keane, Alexa Vega, and Austin Butler star in the series.

On February 2, 2009, ABC Family announced it had ordered a full season of ten episodes, and the series premiere was watched by 1.6 million viewers. However, due to low ratings, the show was canceled at the end of the season.

Cast and characters
Alexa Vega as Ruby Gallagher
Patrick Cassidy as Patrick Gallagher
David Cassidy as David Gallagher
Katie A. Keane as Audie Gallagher
Austin Butler as Jordan Gallagher
Kurt Doss as Ben Gallagher

Critical reception
Ruby & the Rockits received a score of 60 out of 100 from review aggregator Metacritic. Reviews were mixed but generally favorable.  Robert Lloyd, from the Los Angeles Times, stated in his review that the show "feels surprisingly ordinary and uninformed, put together out of scraps from the old sitcom drawer."  In a review in the New York Daily News, David Hinckley also noted the feeling of a 1950s sitcom but, in contrast, said this "isn't totally a bad thing." Hinckley adds that despite the jokes of rock star life, the show "keeps it all remarkably clean and wholesome." Another reviewer says "it's simple enough for the kids and entertaining enough for the adults."

A review in the Boston Globe stated that Ruby & the Rockits has no right to be as likable as it is, and called the show "a warm intergenerational comedy that never pushes life lessons in your face." Similarly, The Hollywood Reporter'''s Randee Dawn noted the "same unicorn-and-rainbows flavor Disney has been shilling out for years", but adds that this "makes it practically perfect in every way." In a review for Variety, Brian Lowry called the show "borderline ridiculous" and stated that "there's nothing much to recommend." Furthermore, the Los Angeles Times'' review said that it was "not especially good."

Episodes

Music
Each week a song in promotion of an episode was released onto the iTunes Store. All songs were performed by Alexa Vega, except where noted.

"Lost in Your Own Life" (released on June 30, 2009)
"You are Where I Live" (released on July 21, 2009)
"The Way It's Gonna Be" (released on July 28, 2009)
"Forever Your Song" (released on August 4, 2009)
"Too High a Price" (released on August 11, 2009)
"Possibilities" (performed by Alexa Vega & Austin Butler) (released on August 18, 2009) 
"Life, I Love You Not" (performed by Austin Butler) (released on September 1, 2009) 
"When I Close My Eyes" (released on September 9, 2009)

References

External links
 

2000s American teen sitcoms
2009 American television series debuts
2009 American television series endings
ABC Family original programming
English-language television shows
Television series about families
Television series about teenagers
Television series by ABC Studios
Television shows set in Florida
Television series created by Shaun Cassidy